Luis Rodolfo Tailhade (born 18 August 1970) is an Argentine lawyer specialized in criminal law and politician, currently serving as National Deputy representing Buenos Aires Province. A member of the Justicialist Party and La Cámpora, Tailhade was first elected in 2015 and was re-elected in 2019. He previously served as General Inspector of Justice from 2013 to 2014, during the presidency of Cristina Fernández de Kirchner, and as the Chamber of Deputies' representative in the Council of Magistracy from 2016 to 2018.

Early life and education
Tailhade was born on 18 August 1970 in Choele Choel, Río Negro Province. He finished high school at the Escuela Comercial N° 13, where he was politically active and served as president of the students' union. He studied law at the Universidad del Museo Social Argentino (UMSA), graduating in 1994 with a specialization in criminal law. He was a member of the Discipline Tribunal of the Colegio Público de Abogados de la Capital Federal (CPAF), the bar association of Buenos Aires.

Political career
In 2008, Tailhade co-founded Abogados por la Justicia Social (AJUS, "Lawyers for Social Justice"), a civil association affiliated with La Cámpora, the youth organization allied to the Front for Victory. From 2011 to 2013, he was an advisor at the Ministry of Justice and Human Rights of Argentina under minister Julio Alak. In 2013, he was elected to the City Council of Malvinas Argentinas. That year, he was also appointed General Inspector of Justice, in replacement of Norberto Carlos Berner.

At the 2015 legislative election, Tailhade was the 10th candidate in the Front for Victory list in Buenos Aires Province. The list received 37.28% of the vote, and Tailhade was elected. He was re-elected in 2019, as the 17th candidate in the Frente de Todos list.

In 2016, Tailhade was elected as one of the Chamber of Deputies' representatives to the Council of Magistracy, in replacement of Héctor Recalde. He served in the position until 12 November 2018, and was replaced by Eduardo de Pedro.

During his 2019–2023 term, Tailhade presided the parliamentary commission on Justice, and formed part of the commissions on Internal Security, Petitions, Powers and Norms, Criminal Legislation, Political Trials, Finances, and Constitutional Affairs. He was a supporter of the legalization of abortion in Argentina, voting in favour of the two Voluntary Interruption of Pregnancy bills that were debated by the Argentine Congress in 2018 and 2020.

Electoral history

References

External links
Profile on the official website of the Chamber of Deputies (in Spanish)

1970 births
Living people
People from Río Negro Province
Members of the Argentine Chamber of Deputies elected in Buenos Aires Province
Members of the Argentine Council of Magistracy
Justicialist Party politicians
Members of La Cámpora
21st-century Argentine politicians